Andrea Santoro (7 September 1945, in Priverno, Italy – 5 February 2006, in Trabzon, Turkey) was a Roman Catholic priest in Turkey, murdered in the Santa Maria Church in Trabzon where he served as a member of the Catholic Church's Fidei donum missionary program. This was one of the high-profile incidents, along with the murder of Armenian journalist Hrant Dink and the Zirve Publishing House murders that focused attention on hate crimes in Turkey.

Death and aftermath

On 5 February 2006 he was shot dead from behind while kneeling in prayer in the church. A witness heard the perpetrator shouting "Allahu Akbar". The motive of the attack is not known.

Oğuzhan Akdin, a 16-year-old high school student, was arrested two days after the shooting, carrying a 9mm pistol. An investigation by the U.S. Air Force Office of Special Investigations on stolen weaponry revealed that this gun had been part of a batch of guns that the US had given to the Iraqi army but which had gone missing. The student told police he had been influenced by the Jyllands-Posten Muhammad cartoons controversy. The murder was preceded by massive anti-Christian propaganda in the Turkish popular press. In the three months before his murder, Santoro's telephone had been tapped by the Turkish police in Trabzon.

On 10 October 2006, Oğuzhan Akdin was sentenced to 18 years, 10 months, and 20 days in prison for "premeditated murder" by a juvenile court in Trabzon. According to head of the local Catholic administration, the Apostolic Vicariate of Anatolia, Bishop Luigi Padovese, neither the killer nor his mother showed any remorse during the trial.

As the murderer of Armenian-Turkish journalist Hrant Dink also came from Trabzon and was also under 18 years of age, Turkish police were investigating possible connections between the slayings of Santoro and Dink. In October 2007, Turkey's Court of Appeals affirmed the jail sentence for Santoro's killer. Following the 2016 Turkish coup d'état attempt, the killer was released from jail after serving less than 10 years of his sentence.

Pope Benedict XVI recalled his martyrdom in his homily at the Shrine of Meryem Ana Evi (House of the Virgin Mary) in Ephesus on 29 November 2006.

At Don Santoro's funeral at the Basilica of St. John Lateran, Cardinal Camillo Ruini, the vicar of the Diocese of Rome, mentioned in his homily that the possible beatification process for Don Santoro may be opened after February 2011. His assassination is marked annually by the Don Andrea Santoro Association, which is organized in part by Cardinal Angelo De Donatis, the Vicar General of Rome and a seminary classmate of Santoro.

See also
 Paulos Faraj Rahho
 Frans van der Lugt
 Jacques Hamel
 List of assassinated people from Turkey

References

External links
 Homily by Andrea Riccardi, founder of the Community of Sant'Egidio in memory of Andrea Santoro

 "Wachs, das sich verzehren lässt" - Church historian Prof. Dr. Rudolf Grulich about life and death of Don Andrea Santoro (German)

1945 births
2006 deaths
People killed by Islamic terrorism
People murdered in Turkey
21st-century Roman Catholic martyrs
21st-century venerated Christians
Italian Servants of God
People associated with the Jyllands-Posten Muhammad cartoons controversy
Italian people murdered abroad
Deaths by firearm in Turkey
Victims of anti-Catholic violence
20th-century Italian Roman Catholic priests